Erkan Öztürk  (born 17 May 1983) is a German-Turkish professional footballer. He is the player-coach (plays as a striker) for amateur German side Inter Monheim.

Club career
Öztürk began his career in Germany playing for Bayer Leverkusen II in the Regionalliga Nord. In August 2004, he moved to Turkey to play for Samsunspor in the Süper Lig.

References

External links
 

1983 births
German people of Turkish descent
Sportspeople from Leverkusen
Footballers from North Rhine-Westphalia
Living people
Turkish footballers
Association football forwards
Bayer 04 Leverkusen II players
Samsunspor footballers
Diyarbakırspor footballers
Gaziantep F.K. footballers
Eyüpspor footballers
İstanbulspor footballers
Çorumspor footballers
Bozüyükspor footballers
Gölcükspor footballers
Regionalliga players
Oberliga (football) players
Süper Lig players
TFF First League players
TFF Second League players
TFF Third League players
Landesliga players